Central Oregon Irrigation District is a municipal corporation to provide irrigation water for Central Oregon, U.S.
The canals serve agricultural and industrial users in the arid lands between Alfalfa, Bend, Redmond, Terrebonne, and Powell Butte.
Among its 4,000 or so individual customer accounts, it also provides municipal water to the city of Redmond, neighboring subdivisions, and parks and schools in Bend.

History 
The Carey Act of 1894 led to the creation of the U.S. Bureau of Reclamation which initiated many irrigation projects by authorizing the federal government to contract with the states for arid land reclamation.
The State of Oregon authorized entrepreneurs to build and operate canal systems for profit.
The right of agricultural users to the water were provisional until irrigation actually began producing crops as provided by the Carey Act.
On June 30, 1950, the State of Oregon decreed that the Carey Act had provided ample time for interested water users to have staked a water rights claim, and ended the eligibility opt-in period to receive irrigation water.
It took until 1958 to finalize Deschutes River water rights for all users.

The Central Oregon Irrigation District was established in 1918 from the merging of water systems near Bend.
Among the earliest was Pilot Butte Development Company, established in 1902 by Alexander M. Drake, a capitalist who arrived in the area in spring of 1900 by covered wagon, lured by the possibility of irrigating upper Deschutes County and dry air for health reasons.
Drake's company platted Bend and built a lodge for which Drake Park District and Drake Park are named.
Before any water flowed, Pilot Butte was sold to Deschutes Irrigation and Power Company.
Service began with  irrigated in 1904.

Two primary canals—Central Oregon Canal and Pilot Butte Canal—were complete by 1907.
Pilot Butte Development Company was foreclosed upon, leading to creation of the Central Oregon Irrigation Company in 1910.
The North Canal Dam was connected to Pilot Butte Canal in 1912.
The company's ownership was given to its users who created the Central Oregon Irrigation District on December 17, 1917, although legal challenges continued until a court resolution emerged July 9, 1921.
Systematic promotion (Free land in Oregon, in the richest grain, fruit and stock section in the world!) and immigration of almost 2,000 people to Bend had the system serving  by 1924.

The Ward Road–Gosney Road segment was added to the National Register of Historic Places on March 18, 2019.

Engineering 
Creating canals through the Central Oregon plain required the most modern technology and engineering in its day.
The land contains thick layer of basalt—a dense, abrasive volcanic rock—underlying relatively thin soils with scant organic matter, typical of the Great Basin arid desert.
Canal routes were chosen carefully to use gravity (instead of pumps) and minimize the amount of excavation.

System 
Slightly more than half the system is in Deschutes County, a little less than half in Crook County, and roughly 5% in Jefferson County.
It generally flows eastward about  before turning northward.

References

External links
Historic American Engineering Record (HAER) documentation, filed under Bend, Deschutes County, OR:

Buildings and structures in Crook County, Oregon
Buildings and structures in Deschutes County, Oregon
Buildings and structures in Jefferson County, Oregon
Canals in Oregon
Geography of Oregon
Historic American Engineering Record in Oregon
Irrigation Districts of the United States
1918 establishments in Oregon